Musicogenic epilepsy is a form of reflex epilepsy with seizures elicited by special stimuli.

It has probably been described for the first time in 1605 by the French philosopher and scholar Joseph Justus Scaliger (1540-1609). Later publications were, in the eighteenth century, among others, by the German physician Samuel Schaarschmidt, in the nineteenth century 1823 by the British physician John C. Cooke, 1881 by the British neurologist and epileptologist William Richard Gowers, as well as in 1913 by the Russian neurologist, clinical neurophysiologist and psychiatrist Vladimir Mikhailovich Bekhterev. In 1937 the British neurologist Macdonald Critchley coined the term for the first time and classified it as a form of reflex epilepsy.

Most patients have temporal lobe epilepsy. Listening, probably also thinking or playing, of usually very specific music with an emotional content triggers focal seizures with or without loss of awareness, occasionally also evolving to bilateral tonic-clonic seizures.

Although musicality is at least in non-musicians predominantly located in the right temporal lobe, the seizure onset may also be left-hemispherical. Of the approximately 100 patients reported in the literature so far, about 75% had temporal lobe epilepsy, women were slightly more affected, and the mean age of onset was about 28 years. Ictal EEG and SPECT findings as well as functional MRI studies localized the epileptogenic area predominantly in the right temporal lobe. Treatment with epilepsy surgery leading to complete seizure freedom has been reported.

Musicogenic Seizures might happen during sleep. Cognitive or emotional appreciation of the stimulus can also be involved. This usually results in a complex partial seizure. But also other seizures like tonic-clonic seizures are also can be seen.

Clinical Aspect
Musicogenic epilepsy is rare epilepsy. The prevalence in the general population is as low as 1 in 10 million. Musicogenic epilepsy typically first progresses later in life. The age of onset is approx 28 years. There are few Instances of onset in childhood and in infancy. It involves contact with the stimulus which results in a seizure. It’s also more common in women in comparison to men. In a few research, it has been found that there is frequently an interruption between the stimulus and the seizure. The seizures are mostly induced by listening to music. It can be triggered by playing or thinking of music. Reports suggest that seizures happened on the basis of the genre of music such as jazz, or classical. Some of them even happened due to particular musical instruments or composers. There are no certain explanations for music-caused seizures. Certain Scientists think that the music might not be the definite cause of the seizure. Music affects emotion and it released the brain chemical (neurotransmitter) called dopamine. This can inhibit the brain’s normal working and cause a seizure. It's mostly seen in people who are musicians or interested in music. Through some studies it can be seen that activity amplified in limbic regions within the temporal lobe. Emotional centres of the brain may be complex, acting as a midway. Both spontaneous and reflex seizures may occur in patients with Musicogenic Epilepsy. Seizures are started by an auditory trigger. The time interval between the stimulus and the seizure is of few minutes. Musicogenic seizures are usually complex focal, with some secondarily generalizing to tonic-clonic seizures.

Causes
There is not any clear explanation for why music can induce epilepsy. It is still a mystery how music can induce epilepsy. Musical involves many electrical and chemical functions of the brain. As the auditory compound is present in the temporal lobe, so the music induced epileptic seizures are considered as Temporal Lobe Epilepsy. Some Scientists cannot explain why music causes seizures in certain people. It might be the way music can touch our emotions. At the time of hearing the songs our brain releases a neurotransmitter known as dopamine. This might interfere with the brain’s normal way of working and cause a seizure.

Diagnosis
An earlier diagnosis will result in more effective treatment. Detailed clinical history of seizures and their triggering factors are necessary for the diagnosis. EEG with acoustic stimuli and a brain MRI are important. It is also recommended to search for anti-GAD antibodies.

Epidemiology
The estimated prevalence of Musicogenic epilepsy is one case per 10,000,000 population.

Treatment
Carbamazepine and phenytoin have been prescribed for the patient as a treatment for Musicogenic epilepsy. Behavioral conditioning may prove effective in the treatment as an alternative to medicine. Surgical treatment should be considered in the rare cases of ME. The non-pharmacological treatments are:
Strictly avoiding the stimuli
Modifying the stimuli
Desensitization
Inhibition

See also 
 Music-specific disorders
 Musicogenic seizure
 Musicophilia: Tales of Music and the Brain

References 

Epilepsy types
Disorders causing seizures
Music psychology
 Rare diseases